Gideon Jon Quantrill Coe (born 22 September 1967 in Canterbury, Kent) is a radio DJ, presenter, sportscaster, voiceover artist and journalist.

Early career
He began his broadcasting career in 1976 as a child presenter on the BBC One TV programme Why Don't You?.

Coe graduated from Coventry's Lanchester Polytechnic (now Coventry University) in 1989, gaining a 2.1 in Communication Studies. During his time there he played rhythm guitar with pop/punk band Cradle Song (AKA The Vendetta Men), having previously played in The Strike It Out Gang (featuring Martin-Kid - Curtis, Michael Clarke, Big Chris Bryan and his brother Simon Coe) and A-Bomb, the latter featuring guitarist Mick Corney and drummer Dom Clark.
He began working in local government for Kent County Council, before starting as a sports broadcaster at BT ClubCall.

Radio work
Coe joined BBC GLR in 1994 as Breakfast show sports reporter, moving up to joint-presentation duties with Fi Glover. He won Sony Awards in 1995 and 1999 for the Sports show.
He has presented shows on BBC Radio 5 Live and BBC Radio 4, where he became a regular guest on Loose Ends. He has also appeared in TV programmes and was presenter of Something for the Weekend on VH1 and The Live Six Show on Sky One. He also does voiceovers for Channel Five as well as contributing to The Guardian.

He joined BBC Radio 6 Music in 2002, presenting the 10am1pm weekday show from the station's launch until October 2007. He won his third Sony Award in 2003 for his work presenting the mid-morning show. On 22 October 2007 Coe's show was moved to 10pm1am, Mondays to Thursdays. This was followed by a move to 9pmmidnight on Mondays to Thursdays in June 2008 - a slot he has maintained for more than 13 years. While the mid-morning show featured live sessions in the 6 Music Hub, the late show specialises in featuring varied sessions and gigs recorded for the archives of BBC Radio.

Personal life
Coe is the son of jazz musician Tony Coe. He has three brothers, is married and has a son. A pescatarian, he is a fan of Tottenham Hotspur and of The Clash.

References

External links 
 
 Gideon Coe (BBC Radio 6 Music)
 Gideon performing with The Vendetta Men

British radio DJs
British radio personalities
1967 births
Living people
Alumni of Coventry University
People educated at Simon Langton Grammar School for Boys
BBC Radio 6 Music presenters
People from Canterbury